Gari convexa is a bivalve mollusc of the family Psammobiidae.

References

Psammobiidae
Bivalves of New Zealand
Bivalves described in 1857
Taxa named by Lovell Augustus Reeve